Inetimi Timaya Odon  (born 15 August 1980), better known by his stage name Timaya, is a multiple award-winning Nigerian singer and songwriter. He hails from Odi, Bayelsa state, South-South Nigeria. Timaya became one of Nigeria's most popular performers by combining Nigerian pop with elements of dancehall, hip-hop, and soca. Dubbed the king of the Afro-Soca music genre, Timaya is well known for his blend of Afro-Caribbean/Dancehall music and other music genres. He is the founder of DM (Dem Mama) Records Limited, which he is also signed to.

His solo career began in 2005 with the release of "Dem Mama", which also appeared on his debut album, True Story released the following year. His second album Gift and Grace was released in 2008. His third studio album De Rebirth was released in partnership with Black Body Entertainment and had the lead single "Plantain Boy". Both were commercially successful. He collaborated with Dem Mama Soldiers on the album LLNP (Long Life N Prosperity). In 2012, Timaya released Upgrade, which spawned hits "Bum Bum", "Sexy Ladies", and "Malonogede". To date, his work has earned him several notable awards and nominations including four Headies Awards wins, 2 AFRIMMA Awards wins, one Nigeria Music Award and an NEA Award.

Early life
Inetimi Timaya Odon was born on 15 August 1980 in Port Harcourt, Rivers State. He grew up as part of a large family; the youngest of fifteen children in Agip Estate, Port Harcourt. His father was a banker and his mother was a trader. For his early education, Odon attended Assemblies of God Nursery And Primary School. His secondary school education began at Nkpolu Oroworukwo in Port Harcourt. He would often break house rules to attend late-night music events. Before Timaya could graduate from school, his mother arranged for him to travel with his older brother and older sister to Lagos. After moving to the city, he gained admission into Lagos' Ikeja Grammar School, where he eventually obtained a secondary school certificate.

Timaya later returned to Port Harcourt to study Banking and Finance at tertiary-level, however, he performed poorly in examinations and dropped out after first semester. He then moved back to Lagos to join Eedris Abdulkareem's hiphop group as a backup vocalist. After three years working for Eedris, Timaya departed from the group to focus on his solo career. He began to record collaborations with fellow up-and-coming artists and made his first cameo appearance in an unreleased music video by UDX, a Lagos-based rap group. He subsequently met producer Obaksolo in Mafoluku, Oshodi, who produced his first major hit record "Dem Mama" after hearing him perform the a cappella version. He worked with Namse Udosen (Menthol X) on the track "Pomporo" on his first album, True Story.

Describing the song in an interview posted in August 2013, Timaya said: "'Dem Mama' was an account of the 1999 destruction of Odi, a river side community in Niger Delta. Soldiers were hunting down militants they alleged killed eight policemen. The village was burnt down and numerous people  killed. I bravely, tackled the issue years later and won instant street credibility for my boldness."

Career

2005-2009 (True Story, Gift & Grace, De Rebirth)
His solo career began in 2005 with the release of his debut single, "Dem Mama," which was an account of the massacre that happened in his community, Odi. The song appeared on his debut album, 'True Story'  released the following year to great critical acclaim. His sophomore album 'Gift and Grace' was released in 2008. He gained further visibility and international prominence through his third studio album, "De Rebirth" released in partnership with Black Body Entertainment—with its lead single, "Plantain Boy." Both were commercially successful as they took over airwaves within and outside Nigeria.

2010-2017 (Upgrade, Epiphany, Bum Bum remix and Grammy nomination)
In 2010, he featured on the song "Kokoroko" by female gospel artist Kefee, which went on to win in the "Best Collaboration" category at the 2010 Headies Awards. He went on to be featured by Kcee in a song titled 'Erima'. On 25 June 2012, Timaya released another album, 'Upgrade' which spawned hits like 'Bum Bum', 'Sexy Ladies, and 'Malonogede. The album featured collaborations with Attitude, Terry G and Vector. Duncan Mighty and Timaya dueted on 'I Know I Know Dat', which was leaked onto the internet a few hours after the former's album footprints was released into stores. Both artists were among the honorees at the fourth annual Odudu Music Awards alongside M-Trill, Sodi Cookey, Becky Enyioma and Timi Dakolo.

In 2014, he released his fifth studio album, titled 'Epiphany'. The album was a 20-tracker, with global hits, such as "Bum Bum Remix" featuring Dancehall A-Lister, Sean Paul, 'Sanko', and 'Ukwu'. It also featured 2Baba Idibia, Patoranking, Olamide, Sir Shina Peters, Deethi, Phyno and Terry G. In 2017, Timaya performed in Nassau, Bahamas where he headlined the first-ever Afro-Soca Concert. In 2018, he bagged his first Grammy nomination in the "Best Reggae Album" category. The Afro-Soca star featured on "Avrakedabra", an album by Morgan Heritage on a track titled "Reggae Night" (global remix). Timaya set up his record label, DM Records Limited, which became home to artistes like Patoranking and Runtown. In 2017, he signed young Dancehall/Afro-Fusion artiste, King Perryy, KillerTunes to the DM Records imprint.

2019-2020 (CHULO VIBES & GRATITUDE)
After 5 years of releasing singles and touring, Timaya released an EP titled Chulo Vibes (2019). This project featured collaborations from East African artist Alikiba, Trinidadian Soca legend, Machel Montano, and Nigeria's Grammy-winning artiste Burna Boy. His sixth solo studio album, "Gratitude", a 15-track body of work, was released in 2020. The projects had hit singles like Balance, I Can't Kill Myself & Gra Gra, Don Dada, and Born To Win, respectively.

2021/2022 (Cold Outside)
In 2021, Timaya teamed up with Nigerian wonderkid, BNXN and hit record producer, Yung Willis for his latest single titled “Cold Outside". After its release, the song became an instant hit and has stayed on the Official Naija Top 10 charts since it was released on October 14. “Cold Outside" raced to over 75 million streams in barely three months of release and has been played over  500 million times around the world. On March 16, 2022, Timaya released the third single “Charger” off his next studio album titled Chuloverse, following Cold Outside and No Pressure. “Charger” Produced by Nigerian Amapiano powerhouse duo, Smeez & D3an, is a modish Amapiano rhythm (a hybrid of deep house, jazz and lounge music characterized by synths, airy pads and wide percussive bass lines which originated from South Africa) caressed by his unique, rhythmic vocals to score deserved points.

Honours
In 2011, Timaya was appointed a Peace Ambassador by the Inter religious and International Federation for World Peace (IIFWP). Dr. Hak Ja Haan Moon, co-founder of the IIFWP, stated that he is "one of those individuals whose lives exemplify the ideal of living for the sake of others, and who dedicate themselves to practices which promote the founding ideals of the IIFWP."

Fashion
He launched the Chulo Brand in 2020 which was inspired by his popular nickname Papi Chulo  or Chulo for short. His fanbase (which is divided into two groups) also calls themselves  ”Chulo Gang” or  “Team Higher." With the Chulo Brand, Timaya says we should expect a fashion line and a cool merchandise rollout as he wants to channel his fashion essence through the brand.

Brand Ambassadorship
MTN 
Globacom 
Hennessy 
Moniepoint

Discography

Albums
 True Story (2007)
 Gift And Grace (2008)
 De Rebirth (2010)
 LLNP Long Life N Prosperity (2011)
 Upgrade (2012)
 Epiphany (2014)
 Chulo Vibes EP (2019)
Gratitude 2020

Selected singles

Videography

Awards and nominations
Afrotainment-Museke Online African Music Awards 
2011:Best Afro-Dancehall song, " Plantain Boy" (Won)
 Nigeria Music Awards
 2008: Album of the Year, True Story (Won)
 The Headies
2008: Best Reggae/Dancehall Album, True Story (Won)
2009: Best Reggae/Dancehall Album, Gift and Grace (Won)
2009: Best Collaboration, "Good or Bad" (with J. Martins and P-Square) (Won)
2009: Artiste of the Year (Nominated)
 2010: Best Collaboration, "Kokoroko" (with Kefee) (Won)
 Nigeria Entertainment Awards
2014: Indigenous Artist of the Year (Nominated)
AFRIMMA
Afrimma 2015 Best Dancehall Artist (Nominated)
Afrimma 2016 Best Dancehall Act of the Year (Nominated)
Afrimma 2017 Dancehall Act of the Year (Won)
Afrimma 2018 Best African Reggae/Dancehall Act (Nominated)
Grammy 2018
Morgan Heritage's Reggae Night (Global Remix) off the album Avrakedabra

Tours
2021 —  Timaya US Tour
2019 – Timaya Chulo Vibes Europe Tour 
2018 – Timaya Live in Canada
2017 – Timaya US Tour

Outstanding Collaboration
Cold Outside feat BNXN
Bum Bum remix feat Sean Paul
Pull Up feat Burna Boy
Malonogede feat Terry G
Life Anagaga - MI feat Timaya
Reggae Night - Morgan Heritage feat Timaya & others
Kokoroko - Kefee feat Timaya
Alubarika - Patoranking feat Timaya

See also

 List of people from Port Harcourt
 List of Nigerian musicians

References

External links

1977 births
Singers from Port Harcourt
Living people
Nigerian male singer-songwriters
21st-century Nigerian male singers
Nigerian hip hop singers
The Headies winners
Nigerian reggae musicians